Karla Gabriela Villalobos Durán (born 16 July 1986) is a Costa Rican footballer who plays as a forward. She has been a member of the Costa Rica women's national team.

International career
Villalobos played all three of Costa Rica's matches at the 2015 FIFA Women's World Cup. On 13 June 2015, at the 89th minute of Costa Rica's second match in the tournament against South Korea, she scored the team's second goal of the match, which earned them a 2–2 draw.

References

External links
 
 Karla Gabriela Villalobos Duran – FIFA World Cup profile
 Profile  at Fedefutbol
 

1986 births
Living people
Costa Rican women's footballers
Costa Rica women's international footballers
2015 FIFA Women's World Cup players
Women's association football forwards
Footballers at the 2015 Pan American Games
Pan American Games competitors for Costa Rica